The Germany national football team manager (German: Bundestrainer, literally 'Federal Coach' or 'Association Coach') is a position created in 1926 and first held by Otto Nerz. The German team began playing matches in 1908, but for 18 years it had no manager. Instead a selection committee chose the team. The current manager, Hansi Flick, took over the team following the UEFA Euro 2020.

Eleven men have occupied the post since its inception, all of whom are German. Seven of the eleven have previously played for the national team, the exceptions being Nerz, Erich Ribbeck, Joachim Löw, and Hansi Flick. Many of the managers previously served as assistant to their predecessor; each of the three managers after Nerz had worked under the previous incumbent,  Löw, was assistant to Jürgen Klinsmann from 2004 to 2006, and the current manager, Hansi Flick, was assistant to Löw from 2006 to 2014.

From 1936 to 1998, the team had just five managers, each of whom won a major trophy, with Helmut Schön (1964–1978) winning two. A span of sixteen years (1990-2006) has seen just four people in the role.

The title Bundestrainer has been in use since 1950 – prior to 1942 the role was titled Reichstrainer ('Reich Coach'). Franz Beckenbauer and Rudi Völler could not be titled Bundestrainer, due to a lack of coaching qualifications, so were titled Teamchef (Team Leader). Their assistants, Horst Köppel/Holger Osieck and Michael Skibbe respectively, were the official Bundestrainer during this time.

The coach of the women's team is called Bundestrainer, too, or denoted with the female form Bundestrainerin.

The German national team is the only national team in which four national coaches (Herberger, Schön, Vogts, and Löw) have sat in more than 100 international matches and, with only eleven national coaches, has significantly fewer coaches than other national teams.

History

Early years
For the first twenty years of its existence, the team had no manager, with the team being picked by a selection committee of the German Football Association, before Otto Nerz was appointed as head coach in 1926. Nerz had a disciplinarian style and achieved respectable results with a hitherto unsuccessful team – reaching third place at the 1934 World Cup. He was unable to fulfil the Nazi Party's high expectations at the 1936 Olympic Games (hosted in Berlin), however, and was replaced by his assistant, Sepp Herberger after the team was eliminated by outsiders Norway.

Herberger was forced to coach a new 'greater Germany' team (including the now-annexed Austria) which meant that he had to involve players from the newly defunct Austrian team. The highly favourited German side, now weakened by the unfamiliar Austrian additions, was immediately knocked out by Switzerland in the first round of the 1938 World Cup, Germany's worst World Cup performance to date. Eventual success from the team was prevented by World War II, and subsequent sanctions against Germany, banning them from international football.

Post-war
The national team was inactive from 1942 to 1950, resuming as West Germany once the ban was lifted. Herberger led the team through qualification for the 1954 World Cup, which they won in surprise fashion, beating Hungary in the final. The win is credited with playing a large part in the nation's psychological and economic recovery after World War II. West Germany managed creditable results at the 1958 and 1962 World Cups, before Herberger retired in 1964, 28 years after first taking the job. He was succeeded by his assistant, Helmut Schön.

Glory years

Schön, who had managed the short-lived Saarland national team from 1952 to 1956, began to establish West Germany as a consistent force in world football. He took the team to the 1966 World Cup final, and despite failing to qualify in West Germany's first entry to the European Championship in 1968, he achieved a third-place finish 1970 World Cup in Mexico. Then came the team's greatest successes – a first European Championship title was won in 1972, which was followed by the 1974 World Cup, where West Germany, as hosts, ran out tournament winners, beating the Netherlands in the final. Schön is one of only two coaches to win both the World Cup and European Championship, the other being Spain's Vicente del Bosque. In 1976, West Germany came within a penalty shoot-out of defending their European crown, losing against Czechoslovakia in the final. Before the 1978 World Cup, Schön announced that this was to be his last tournament, but was unable to go out on a high note, as the team was eliminated by neighbours Austria in Round 2. He retired having managed 25 World Cup games and won 16, both tournament records which remain to this day.

Schön was succeeded by his assistant, Jupp Derwall. Derwall's tenure began successfully. The team won a second European Championship in 1980, and reached the Final of the 1982 World Cup, However, he was sacked after West Germany were eliminated in the first round of the 1984 European Championship.

Derwall was replaced by Franz Beckenbauer, who had made 103 appearances for the national team, and was captain of the successful side of the early 1970s. This appointment ended the run of promoting assistants – Beckenbauer had not previously been part of the DFB coaching setup, and had no previous managerial experience. He led the team to a second consecutive World Cup Final in 1986, before reaching the semi-final of the 1988 European Championship, a tournament which West Germany hosted. the 1990 World Cup was to be his last tournament, but he ended on a high, winning the tournament for the third time, and becoming the only man to lift the trophy as a captain and as coach. He stood down immediately afterwards, to be replaced by Berti Vogts, a former national squad team-mate who had served on the coaching staff of the DFB.

Reunification and decline

Vogts took on a now-reunified Germany, and led the team, including players from the former East Germany, to the final of Euro 1992, only to lose against underdogs Denmark. Germany were eliminated from the 1994 World Cup in similarly dramatic fashion, losing against Bulgaria in the quarter-finals. Vogts' greatest achievement was the 1996 European Championship, which Germany won, beating the Czech Republic in the final, thanks to a golden goal from Oliver Bierhoff. However, the 1998 World Cup proved unsuccessful, with an ageing German team knocked out by Croatia in the quarter-final. Vogts resigned shortly afterwards.

The DFB announced that Paul Breitner, another player from the 1970s team, would be Vogts' replacement, only to go back on this decision after just 17 hours. Eventually a manager was appointed: Erich Ribbeck, who had managed several top German clubs, and had been assistant to Jupp Derwall, but was now 61, and in semi-retirement. The talent pool in Germany at this time was poor, with few young players emerging, and Ribbeck oversaw a disastrous Euro 2000 campaign, with Germany eliminated in the first round, with just one point from their three group games. This led to Ribbeck's immediate resignation.

Rebuilding and success

The next man to take charge of the team was Rudi Völler, who had been part of the 1990 World Cup-winning team, but had no coaching experience. He was intended to be an interim appointment, standing in for a year while the intended appointee, Christoph Daum, served out his contract at Bayer Leverkusen. However, Daum failed a drugs test, testing positive for cocaine, and Völler was given the job permanently. After a tricky qualifying campaign, Völler led the team to the final of the 2002 World Cup, a result that was unexpected given the perceived lack of quality in the squad. Euro 2004 was less successful, though, with Germany eliminated in the first-round, having failed to win a match for a second successive European Championship, including being held to a 0-0 draw by minnows Latvia.

Völler then resigned from the job, and with Germany due to host the next World Cup, they once again opted for an inexperienced manager, Völler's old strike partner Jürgen Klinsmann. Klinsmann attempted to introduce a new playing style to the team, based on young players, and an attack-minded mentality. Germany achieved third place at the 2006 World Cup, after a dramatic semi-final defeat to Italy. Klinsmann stood down afterwards, despite being offered a renewed contract.

Klinsmann was succeeded by his assistant, Joachim Löw, who has continued in much the same manner as his predecessor. After comfortably qualifying for Euro 2008, the team reached the final, losing 1–0 to Spain. Löw continued in the role and qualified for the 2010 World Cup, in which the Team lost the semi-final 1–0 against Spain after overwhelming victories against Argentina (4–0) and England (4–1). They finished in third place for the second FIFA World Cup running, after beating Uruguay 3–2. Still under the management of Löw, Germany qualified top of Group A in qualification for UEFA Euro 2012 with a record of 10 wins out of ten matches against Kazakhstan, Turkey, Austria, Belgium, and Azerbaijan. Germany was placed along with Portugal, Netherlands, and Denmark, thus making it the group of death. As the only team to have won all three group matches, Germany went on to defeat Greece in the quarter-final and set a historic record in international football of 15 consecutive wins in all competitive matches. In the semi-final match against Italy, despite high expectations, Germany was unable to break the record to defeat Italy in any competitive matches. At the 2014 FIFA World Cup, they were pitted alongside Portugal (4–0), Ghana (2–2) and the United States (1–0) in Group G. They reached the final, for a record eighth time and after twelve years, since 2002, after eliminating Algeria (2–1 after extra time), France (1–0) and a historic win against Brazil (7–1) in the knockout stage. In the final, Germany defeated Argentina with 1–0 in extra time, winning their fourth title, the first since 1990. In 2021, Löw announced his retirement as manager of the team after UEFA Euro 2020. This followed Germany's poor performances in the 2018 World Cup, where they exited the tournament in the first round for the first time since 1938, as well as in the 2018–19 UEFA Nations League.

Statistical summary
Statistics are correct as of 29 March 2022

Key

 

Notes:

References

Lists of national association football team managers